"Right Now" is an uptempo 1962 jazz/pop song with music by Herbie Mann and lyrics by Carl Sigman. As a jazz instrumental, it was the title track of Right Now, a 1962 bossa nova-style album by Mann. Later that same year, with lyrics by Sigman, the song was popularized by jazz singer Mel Tormé on his album Comin' Home Baby!, and was the B-side of the single featuring the title track.

It was later covered in a variety of pop styles, including recordings by Siouxsie Sioux and her second band the Creatures, who scored a top 15 hit in the UK Singles Chart in 1983, and the Pussycat Dolls in 2005.

Selected list of recorded versions
1962 Herbie Mann — jazz instrumental on the album Right Now
1962 Mel Tormé — jazz vocal version on the album Comin' Home Baby!
1969 Salena Jones — on the album The Moment of Truth
1983 The Creatures (Siouxsie Sioux's second band) — UK single 
2005 The Pussycat Dolls — on the album PCD
2008 Leon Jackson — on the album Right Now

The Creatures version

The Creatures ( singer Siouxsie Sioux and drummer Budgie) recorded a cover version of "Right Now" in 1983. Co-produced by Mike Hedges, it was released as a single by Polydor Records on July 8, 1983. Their version, recorded in '60s style with a brass section (Gary Barnacle on saxophone, Peter Thoms on trombone and Luke Tunney on trumpet) and timpani, later peaked at No. 14 in the UK Singles Chart, leading to an appearance on BBC's Top of the Pops.

The Creatures' version started with a distinct introduction, with Siouxsie clicking her fingers to mark the tempo. She also added the "palala pam pam" that she sings before the arrival of the congas. These special arrangements were not present in the initial version by Mel Tormé; they were created by the Creatures. Pussycat Dolls would later record another version of "Right Now" with this distinct introduction arranged by Siouxsie and Budgie.

The Creatures' single was praised by contemporary critics.

Melody Maker'''s Paul Colbert said in his review, "The Creatures slipped through an unlocked back window, ransacked the place and left with the best ideas in a fast car.  Like all the greatest criminal minds they strike without a warning and only they know the plan.  We have to piece the clues into a cover story. From the earliest seconds of 'Right Now' you know you're on shifting ground. Siouxsie baba da baping away to the noise of her own fingers clicking until Budgie barges in with congas on speed. Christ which way is this going? The one direction you don't expect is a vagrant big band coughing out drunken bursts of brass in a Starlight Room of its own making. Budgie and Siouxsie - the Fred and Ginger of the wayward world".Number One's Paul Bursche shared the same of point of view, writing, "A big blast of '60s swing laced with a deft '80s touch sung by none other than the graceful - Siouxsie? Releasing a cover version of Mel Tormé's classic is about the most alternative thing the Creatures could have done. And it works. The siren really sounds great as layer after layer of multi-tracked voice get going. And wait for the video. A gold plated hit for sure".

The video, featuring Siouxsie covered in golden powder, was directed by Tim Pope and uploaded on the Creatures' official Dailymotion channel. 

The Creatures' version of "Right Now" was later included on the band's 1997 compilation album A Bestiary Of. It was also featured in the film My Best Friend's Birthday,  which was Quentin Tarentino's work in 1987.

 The Pussycat Dolls version

"Right Now" was covered by American girl group the Pussycat Dolls for their debut studio album, PCD (2005). The Dolls used the same arrangement as the Creatures' version, including the introduction with the "palala pam pam" sung by the female singers, and the clicked fingers that marked the tempo. These arrangements were not present on the original version by Mel Tormé. On the original album version, Carmit Bachar sang the third verse and Melody Thornton sang background vocals and ad-libs at the end of the song.

In 2006, "Right Now" (with slightly reworked lyrics) was used as the alternate opening and "bumper" theme to the NBA on ABC with several commercials filmed of the group dancing to the song. The NBA Version was sung completely by Dolls lead singer Nicole Scherzinger. In September 2006, ABC also used the song to promote "Listen to the Rain on the Roof", the first episode of the third season of Desperate Housewives''.

The Pussycat Dolls' NBA Version of "Right Now" was released by A&M Records/Interscope Records as a digital single on January 23, 2007.

References

1962 songs
2007 singles
Jazz songs
ABC Sports
Songs written by Carl Sigman